Bremangerlandet is an island in Bremanger Municipality in the traditional district of Nordfjord in Vestland county, Norway. The  island is one of the largest islands in the county.

The island is located northeast of the smaller island of Frøya.  Bremangerlandet island lies on the southern side of the mouth of the large Nordfjorden and the island of Vågsøy lies on the north side of the fjord's mouth.  The small island of Husevågøy lies in the middle of the fjord, just north of Bremangerlandet. 
The island is connected to the island of Frøya (to the southwest) by a series of bridges.  There is a ferry connection to Husevågøy and Vågsøy islands to the north.  There is also a road that connects Bremangerlandet to the island of Rugsundøya by the Skatestraum Tunnel (and then Rugsundøya connects to the mainland via a bridge).  To the southeast, the island is separated from the mainland by the Frøysjøen strait.

The main population center on the island is the village of Bremanger, where Bremanger Church is located. The village of Berle is located on the eastern side of the island, and it is home to Berle Church.

Name
The meaning of the name is "the (is)land of (the parish) Bremanger". The original name of the island must however have been Smöls. In Norse literature is the mountain Hornelen called Smalsarhorn, which means "the horn of (the island) Smöls". The old name is related to the word möl which means "bank made of stones and gravel". (For the missing s see the Indo-European s-mobile.)

Media gallery

See also
List of islands of Norway
List of islands of Norway by area

References

Islands of Vestland
Bremanger